José Antonio Agudelo Gómez (born 7 August 1959) is a Colombian former professional racing cyclist. He rode in three editions of the Tour de France and four editions of the Vuelta a España.

Major results
1981
 1st Stage 5 Vuelta a Colombia
1983
 1st Stage 10 Vuelta a Colombia
1984
 6th Overall Clásico RCN
1985
 1st Stage 7 Vuelta a España
 5th Overall Tour de l'Avenir
1st Stage 7

Grand Tour general classification results timeline

References

External links
 

1959 births
Living people
Colombian male cyclists
Colombian Vuelta a España stage winners
Sportspeople from Antioquia Department
20th-century Colombian people